Manoba suffusata is a moth in the family Nolidae. It was described by Wileman and West in 1929. It is found in Taiwan, Thailand, Vietnam and Myanmar, as well as on Sumatra and Borneo. The habitat consists of alluvial forests, wet heath forests, lowland forests, gardens and secondary forests.

Adults are pale brown with dark fasciae on the forewings.

Taxonomy
The taxon was previously placed as a synonym of Manoba punctilineata by Inoue in Heppner and Inoue in 1992, but later research concluded it is a distinct species.

References

Moths described in 1929
Nolinae